Mahamat Goubaye Youssouf (born 27 July 1998) is a male Chadian sprinter. He competed in the 100 metres event at the 2015 World Championships in Athletics in Beijing, China.

See also
 Chad at the 2015 World Championships in Athletics

References

External links

Chadian male sprinters
Living people
Place of birth missing (living people)
1998 births
World Athletics Championships athletes for Chad